Irina T. Sorokina (born 1963) is a Russian laser physicist. She works in Norway as a professor of physics at the Norwegian University of Science and Technology, and is the founder and CEO of spin-off company ATLA Lasers AS.

Education and career
Sorokina was born in Moscow in 1963. Her father was a physicist who worked on the detection of the cosmic microwave background in the early 1950s and by the 1960s had moved to nonlinear optics and lasers; inspired by him, Sorokina says that she "fell in love with physics, and optics in particular" by the age of 5 or 6.

After earning a master's degree in physics and mathematics at Moscow State University, Sorokina completed a Ph.D. through the Russian Academy of Sciences in 1992. In 2003 she earned a habilitation at TU Wien in Austria.

She was affiliated with TU Wien as a researcher and lecturer from 1991 until 2007, when she moved to the Norwegian University of Science and Technology.

Recognition
Sorokina was elected to the 2007 class of OSA Fellows "for pioneering contributions to tunable and ultrashort-pulse lasers and their applications in spectroscopy, particularly based on novel materials in the near- and mid-infrared spectral ranges". She is also a member of the Royal Norwegian Society of Sciences and Letters, elected in 2009, and is a 2004 winner of the Snell Premium of the Institution of Electrical Engineers.

References

External links
NTNU Laser Physics Group

Living people
Norwegian physicists
Russian physicists
Russian women physicists
Laser researchers
Moscow State University alumni
TU Wien alumni
Academic staff of the Norwegian University of Science and Technology
Royal Norwegian Society of Sciences and Letters
Fellows of Optica (society)
1963 births